The Lord High Commissioner of the Ionian Islands was the local representative of the British government in the United States of the Ionian Islands between 1816 and 1864, succeeding the earlier office of the Civil Commissioner of the Ionian Islands. At the time, the United States of the Ionian Islands was a federal republic under the amical protection of the United Kingdom, as established under the 1815 Treaty of Paris. Governors were based in Corfu, northernmost of the seven Ionian Islands, which are off the western coast of mainland Greece.

List

Civil Commissioners (1809–1816)

Lord High Commissioners (1816–1864)

Notes

External links
World Statesmen – Greece (Ionian Islands)

Ionian Islands, Lord High Commissioner
Lord High Commissioner
Ionian